Yegor (Cyrillic: Его́р) is a Russian, Belarusian and Ukrainian given name. Alternative spellings include Egor, Egori, Yahor,Yehor (Ukrainian), Jegor (common variant in Slavic countries with a Latin alphabet) and
Jegors (Latvian and Lithuanian variant.) The name has Balto-Slavic origin that means "hunter", "spearman" and "warrior". It is related to the Germanic name Jäger,  Scandinavian name Jæger and Finnish name Yrjö. Since the name Yegor is of pagan origin, the Eastern Orthodox Church baptizes people with this name under a pseudonym name Giorgos, which is seen as the Christianized version of the name.
It is shared by the following people:
Egor Anisimov (born 1987), Russian politician
Egor Antropov (born 1992), Russian ice hockey player
Egor Averin (born 1989), Russian ice hockey player
Egor Babaev (born 1973), Russian-born Swedish physicist
Egor Baranov (born 1988), Russian film director
Egor Bazin (born 1995), Russian ice dancer
Egor Beroev (born 1977), Russian actor
Egor Degtyarev, Russian swimmer
Egor Druzhinin (born 1972), Russian actor and film director
Egor Dugin (born 1990), Russian ice hockey player
Egor Egorovich Staal (1822-1907), Russian diplomat
Egor Feoktistov (born 1993), Russian volleyball player
Egor Filipenko (born 1988), Belarusian association football player
Egor Gerasimov (born 1992), Belarusian tennis player
Egor Golovkin (born 1983), Russian former pair skater
Egor Kliuka (born 1995), Russian volleyball player of Belarusian descent
Egor Korotkov (born 1986), Russian skier
Egor Koulechov (born 1994), Israeli-Russian professional basketball player for Israeli team Ironi Nahariya
Egor Kreed (born 1994), Russian rapper and singer-songwriter
Egor Krimets (born 1992), Uzbek football player of Ukrainian descent
Egor Kuimov (born 1999), Russian swimmer
Egor Kuroptev, Russian and Georgian political expert and media manager
Egor Lavrov (born 1981), Russian businessman
Egor Lazarev (1855-1937), Russian revolutionary, populist, politician, delegate, education minister, and writer
Egor Makovsky (1802–1866), Russian painter and accountant
Egor Matvievici (born 1997), Moldovan tennis player
Egor Mekhontsev (born 1984), Russian boxer
Egor Milovzorov (born 1987), Russian ice hockey player
Egor Orudzhev (born 1995), Russian racing driver
Egor Popov (1913-2001), American engineer
Egor Sharov (born 1988), Russian Paralympian athlete
Egor Shastin (born 1982), Ukrainian-Russian ice hockey player
Egor Shaykov (born 1980), former Russian football and beach soccer player
Egor Shuppe (born 1971), Russian and British businessman and venture investor
Egor Silin (born 1988), Russian road racing cyclist
Egor Vyaltsev (born 1985), Russian basketball player
Egor Yakovlev (born 1991), Russian ice hockey player
Egor Zakroev (born 1993), Russian pair skater
Egor Zheshko (born 1999), Belarusian singer
Jegor Solovjov (1871-1942), Estonian politician
Yahor Maistrov (born 1988), Belarusian former ice dancer
Yahor Zubovich (born 1989), Belarusian footballer
Yegor Altman (born 1975), Russian businessman
Yegor Alyoshin (born 1992), Russian ice hockey player
Yegor Azovskiy (born 1985), Kazakh association football player
Yegor Baburin (born 1993), Russian association football player
Yegor Borisov (born 1954), Russian politician
 Yegor Chernyshov (footballer, born 1997)
 Yegor Chernyshov (footballer, born 1998)
Yegor Chinakhov (born 2001), Russian ice hockey player
Yegor Danilkin (born 1995), Russian football player
Yegor Gaidar (1956–2009), Russian economist and politician
Yegor Generalov (born 1993), Russian football player
Yegor Glukhov (born 1998), Russian football player
Yegor Golenkov (born 1999), Russian football player
Yegor Ivanovich Zolotarev (1847-1878), Russian mathematician
Yegor Kholodilov (born 1999), Russian football player
Yegor Kiryakov (born 1974), Russian association football player
Yegor Kondakov (born 1998), Russian football player
Yegor Korshkov (born 1996), Russian ice hockey player
Yegor Kryshtafovich (born 1980), Russian association football player
Yegor Ligachyov (1920–2021), Russian politician
Yegor Letov (1964–2008), Russian poet and musician
Yegor Martynov (born 1990), Russian ice hockey player
Yegor Mikhailov (born 1978), Russian ice hockey player
Yegor Nikolayev (born 1988), Russian runner
Yegor Nikulin (born 1997), Russian football player
Yegor Okorokov (born 1989), Russian football player
Yegor Omelyanenko (born 1993), Russian former ice hockey player
Yegor Petrov (1862-1918), Russian worker and deputy
Yegor Podomatsky (born 1976), Russian ice hockey player
Yegor Polakoff (born 2002), American Film Maker
Yegor Prutsev (born 2002), Russian football player
Yegor Rudkovsky (born 1996), Russian football player
Yegor Sharangovich (born 1998), Belarusian ice hockey player
Yegor Shevchenko (born 1978), Russian association football player
Yegor Solomatin (born 1964), Russian politician
Yegor Sorokin (born 1995), Russian footballer
Yegor Stroyev (born 1937), Russian politician
Yegor Sysuyev (born 1997), Russian football player
Yegor Tarakanov (born 1987), Russian football player
Yegor Titov (born 1976), Russian association football player and coach
Yegor Tolstoy (1802-1874) Russian general and politician
Yegor Yakovlev (1930-2005), Russian journalist
Yegor Yegorov (born 1992), Russian football referee and a former player
Yegor Yevdokimov (born 1982), Russian handball player
Yegor Zhukov (born 1998), Russian radio host and blogger
Yegor Zhuravlyov (born 1990), Russian ice hockey player
Yehor Luhachov (born 1988), retired Ukrainian footballer
Yegor Kutulin (born 2000), old turtle

Given names
Russian masculine given names